Holly Rachel Candy (born 11 May 1983), known professionally as Holly Valance, is an Australian model, actress and singer. Valance began her acting career on the Australian soap opera Neighbours, as Felicity Scully (1999–2002, 2005, 2022). She released her first album, Footprints (October 2002), which provided her top 3 singles, "Kiss Kiss" (April 2002), "Down Boy" (September) and "Naughty Girl" (December). By that time she had relocated to Los Angeles. Her second and final album, State of Mind, appeared in November 2003. Her film roles include, DOA: Dead or Alive (2006), Pledge This! (2006), Taken (2008) and Kambakkht Ishq (2009). Valance has lived in her mother's native United Kingdom since 2009 and became a contestant on the BBC One dance competition Strictly Come Dancing in 2011. In 2013, she was a mentor and judge of fashion competition, Shopaholic Showdown. In September 2012, Valance married British property developer Nick Candy; the couple have two children.

Early life

Holly Valance was born on 11 May 1983, as Holly Rachel Vukadinović, in Fitzroy, Victoria to a Serbian father, Rajko Vukadinović, and a British mother, Rachel (née Stephens), of English and Spanish descent. Her father was a former pianist and model in his native Belgrade, Serbia, former Yugoslavia. Her mother, whose father was a relative of Benny Hill, was a model in the United Kingdom. Valance's parents divorced in 1986 and she has a sister, Coco. Rajko later remarried, and Holly has a half-sister, Olympia, who has also acted in Neighbours (2014–2018). In Melbourne Rajko ran a "trendy imported European clothes store". She started modelling as a teenager, when "she posed for supermarket catalogues and ad campaigns and by 14 she was earning $200 an hour modelling children's clothes and teenage lingerie." Valance grew up in Melbourne and moved to the UK when she was 18; she holds both Australian and British citizenship. After two years she moved to Los Angeles, where she spent seven years before returning to the United Kingdom.

Career

1999–2003: Neighbours and music

In 1999 at age 16, Valance was cast in the Australian TV soap opera, Neighbours, as Felicity "Flick" Scully. Soon after gaining the role she left her Catholic school, "where girls were given detention for wearing make-up or having a hem above the knee." She appeared in Human Nature's music video for "He Don't Love You" (November 2000), "in a raunchy shower scene." Valance left Neighbours in 2002 to start her music career.

Her first single, released in April 2002, was "Kiss Kiss", an English language cover version of Turkish singer, Tarkan's "Şımarık". Australian musicologist, Ian McFarlane, described it as "a catchy dance pop hit." It entered both the ARIA Singles and UK Singles Charts at No. 1. It charted in the top ten in seventeen countries, including reaching number one in Macedonia. The music video's director's cut appeared to show Valance dancing naked. She later explained that she was topless but wearing flesh-coloured underwear. The song was nominated for four ARIA Music Awards in 2002.

Valance's second single, "Down Boy" (September), peaked at No. 2 in the UK and No. 3 in Australia. Her first album, Footprints, was released on 14 October 2002, which reached No. 9 in the UK and No. 15 in Australia. She co-wrote the album track, "The Harder They Come", with Rob Davis (ex-Mud), who supplied guitar for the album. The album's third and final single, "Naughty Girl" (December) peaked at No. 3 in Australia and No. 16 in the UK.

Valance's second album, State of Mind, appeared in November 2003 and its title track, was the lead single. It peaked at No. 8 in the UK and at No. 14 in Australia, but the album did not reach the top 50 in either market. Following legal problems and poor sales from State of Mind, Valance was reportedly dropped from her recording company. She denied this, "I asked to be released, but Warner refused, so I hung out for a year until the contract expired. We parted on good terms." Valance later confirmed she is no longer interested in recording music, telling Men's Style magazine: "I do something until it's not fun any more and then move on. Music wasn't fun any more."

2004–2011: Prison Break and films

In 2004, Valance returned to acting, this time in the United States, appearing in episodes of the television series CSI: Miami and Entourage. In 2005, she appeared in an episode of CSI: NY. In 2005 Valance returned to music, albeit briefly, when she appeared on Har Mar Superstar's album The Handler singing on the tracks, "DUI", "Back the Camel Up" and "Body Request". She appeared in Prison Break in 2006 as Nika Volek, a role which she continued to portray in the show's second season. Also in 2006, Valance appeared in the National Lampoon comedy Pledge This!, alongside American socialite Paris Hilton. The same year, she starred in DOA: Dead or Alive, an adaptation of the popular video game Dead or Alive, in which she played Christie. In 2007, she appeared in the TV series Shark and Moonlight. In 2008 she had a role in the film Taken alongside Liam Neeson, and appeared in an episode of The CW series Valentine.

In 2009, she appeared in Frankmusik's video for his single "Confusion Girl". She also leaked a track called "Superstar" in 2009. In 2009 Valance played Brenda Snow for the video game Command & Conquer Red Alert 3: Uprising. She also appeared in Scott Caan's film Mercy. Valance took part in the 2011 series of Strictly Come Dancing, where she was paired with the professional winner of series 8, Artem Chigvintsev. Valance and Chigvintsev were eliminated in the semi-final of the competition on 11 December 2011, giving them a fourth-place finish. She also starred in the Miss Marple television episode called "The Pale Horse".

2012–present

In 2013, Valance was mentor and judge of fashion competition Shopaholic Showdown. In 2015, she starred in the action film Red Herring as Angela. In 2022, she reprised her role of Flick Scully with a special appearance in the final episode of Neighbours.

Personal life

After living in Los Angeles for seven years, Valance returned to Britain in 2009. That summer she had a brief relationship with English musician Vince Frank (FrankMusik) after appearing in the video for his "Confusion Girl" single. She had previously dated Australian actor Alex O'Loughlin from 2005 to 2009. On 29 September 2012, Valance married billionaire British property developer Nick Candy in Beverly Hills, California. In November 2013, Valance gave birth in London to their first child, a daughter. In September 2017, they had a second daughter.

Legal issues

In 2003, Valance fired her then-manager Scott Michaelson by telephone, 15 months before his contract was due to expire. Biscayne Partners sued Valance Corp., won the case and was awarded damages by the Supreme Court of New South Wales. During the trial, Valance's mother claimed Michaelson had been negligent as a manager, which forced her to take over from him. The former Neighbours co-star Kym Valentine also gave evidence that Valance "said she was feeling bad, a bit stressed out, because she was leaving Scott" and that "she said the solicitors for her record company would get her out of the contract and would be faxing him the paper work (from the UK) to do so." In court, Valance denied that she had said this to Valentine, even though she had signed an affidavit stating she had no recollection of the conversation.

Justice Clifford Einstein said, "I have given close consideration to the question of whether or not the circumstances presently before the Court which do, it seems to me, show a calculated disregard of the rights of Biscayne as well as a cynical pursuit of benefit". The court subsequently ordered Valance Corp. pay $350,000 to Biscayne Partners Pty. Ltd. Of this amount, $47,264.56 was "from shares Ms Valance and Mr Michaelson had bought together on the London Stock Exchange", though the court did not award in favour of Biscayne getting a percentage of sales of her album, State of Mind.

Endorsements and charities

In addition to film and television roles, Valance has also appeared in adverts for Schwarzkopf hair care products and 1800 Reverse. In 2011, Valance appeared in an advert for Foster's Gold bottled beer.
In 2015, Valance became an Ambassador for The Children's Trust, the UK's leading charity for children with brain injury and neurodisability.

Filmography

Discography

 Footprints (2002)
 State of Mind (2003)

Awards and nominations

References

External links

 
 
 
 Holly Valance interview with CNN, December 2006
 Holly Valance interview By Gilles Nuytens – The Scifi World

1983 births
21st-century Australian actresses
Actresses from Melbourne
Australian expatriates in England
Australian film actresses
Australian people of Serbian descent
Australian people of English descent
Australian people of Spanish descent
Australian soap opera actresses
Living people
Australian women pop singers
21st-century Australian singers
21st-century Australian women singers
People educated at Star of the Sea College, Melbourne